Robert Lee "Red" Worthington (April 24, 1906 – December 8, 1963) was an American professional baseball player. The outfielder, a native of Alhambra, California, appeared in 292 games and four seasons in Major League Baseball with the Boston Braves (1931–1934) and St. Louis Cardinals (1934).

Worthington's 13-year professional career began in 1925. Acquired by the Cardinals' farm system in 1927, he put up three outstanding seasons in the upper levels of the minor leagues from 1928–1930, with seasons of 212, 202 and 175 hits, and batting averages of .352, .327 and .375; in the last of those years, 1930, he missed the batting title of the top-level International League by .001 to his Rochester teammate, Ripper Collins. Despite his minor-league production, he could not earn a roster spot on the major-league Cardinals, and his contract was sold to the Boston Braves on September 15, 1930. The  season saw him play in only 41 games for Boston, and—after he was sold back to St. Louis in September—one game for the Cardinals. He played in the top-level Pacific Coast League for three more years, 1935–1937, before leaving the game, and after his baseball career he served in the United States Army during World War II.

In his four MLB seasons, Red Worthington batted .287 lifetime, and collected 298 hits, with 69 doubles, 18 triples and 12 home runs. He was credited with 111 runs batted in.  He died in Sepulveda, California, at the age of 57.

References

External links

1906 births
1963 deaths
Baseball players from California
Boston Braves players
Houston Buffaloes players
Major League Baseball left fielders
Mission Reds players
Oakland Oaks (baseball) players
Rochester Red Wings players
Sacramento Solons players
Sportspeople from Alhambra, California
Syracuse Stars (minor league baseball) players
Waterloo Hawks (baseball) players
United States Army personnel of World War II